Nicholas Guy Eades Walker (born 7 August 1984, Enfield), known as Nick Walker, is an English former professional cricketer. He is a right-handed batsman and a right-arm medium-fast bowler who has played for Derbyshire from 2004 to 2006 and Leicestershire 2006–2008.

Walker attended Haileybury and Imperial Service College for school and studied at Durham University, but chose to leave his course after two academic terms. 

Walker's debut came in April 2004, where he batted at eleven and saw no action. Otherwise generally impressive during his first few games, he hit a powerful six of the bowling of Shane Warne in just his third match. When faced with the West Indians later in the year, he struggled even as a bowler, picking up a mere single wicket.

He moved to Leicestershire in 2006 and in his debut match, picked up a wicket, despite being out for a duck in Leicestershire's innings. Walker has had a few opportunities in the first team but despite his ability to swing the ball at pace, he has yet to establish himself.

Walker has also played Minor Counties cricket for Hertfordshire in the Western Division.

Walker left Leicestershire and cricket in February 2008 to pursue a career in the City of London.

References

External links
Nick Walker at Cricket Archive 

1984 births
English cricketers
Living people
Derbyshire cricketers
Leicestershire cricketers
Hertfordshire cricketers
People educated at Lochinver House School
People educated at Haileybury and Imperial Service College
Alumni of Durham University